Conus stimpsoni, common name Stimpson's cone, is a species of sea snail, a marine gastropod mollusk in the family Conidae, the cone snails and their allies.

Like all species within the genus Conus, these snails are predatory and venomous. They are capable of "stinging" humans, therefore live ones should be handled carefully or not at all.

Distribution
This species occurs in the Caribbean Sea from Florida to Yucatan, Mexico.

Description 
The maximum recorded shell length is 50 mm.

Original description: The shell consists of about twelve whorls. The slopes of the spire somewhat concave, turreted. The nuclear whorl is rounded and smooth. The following four whorls are furnished with a beaded keel at the shoulder. This keel becomes entire on the subsequent whorls. Above the shoulder, the whorls are slightly concave. The suture is appressed. There are about three faint spiral grooves on the concave surface. The body whorl shows shallow squarish channels. The periostracum is thin, pale straw color, finely axially striated. The color of the shell is pinkish white, suffused with salmon pink near the shoulder and on the spire and base, with a very faint, cloudy band of the same about midway between base and shoulder.

Habitat 
Minimum recorded depth is 42 m. Maximum recorded depth is 196 m.

References

   Clench, William James, Johnson, Charles Willison, Johnsonia v.1 = no 1-18 (1941-1945)
 Abbott, R. Tucker, American seashells (1954)
 Tucker J.K. & Tenorio M.J. (2009) Systematic classification of Recent and fossil conoidean gastropods. Hackenheim: Conchbooks. 296 pp.
 Puillandre N., Duda T.F., Meyer C., Olivera B.M. & Bouchet P. (2015). One, four or 100 genera? A new classification of the cone snails. Journal of Molluscan Studies. 81: 1–23

External links
 The Conus Biodiversity website
Cone Shells – Knights of the Sea
 

stimpsoni
Gastropods described in 1902